Reading is a market town and borough in Berkshire, England. Located in the Thames Valley at the confluence of the rivers Thames and Kennet.

Reading is a major commercial centre, especially for information technology and insurance. It is also a regional retail centre, serving a large area of the Thames Valley with its shopping centres, including the Oracle, the Broad Street Mall, and the pedestrianised area around Broad Street. It is home to the University of Reading. Every year it hosts the Reading Festival, one of England's biggest music festivals. Reading has a professional association football team, Reading F.C., and participates in many other sports.

Reading dates from the 8th century. It was an important trading and ecclesiastical centre in the Middle Ages, the site of Reading Abbey, one of the largest and richest monasteries of medieval England with strong royal connections, of which the 12th-century abbey gateway and significant ancient ruins remain. By 1525, Reading was the largest town in Berkshire, and tenth in England for taxable wealth. The town was seriously affected by the English Civil War, with a major siege and loss of trade, but played a pivotal role in the Glorious Revolution, whose only significant military action was fought on its streets. The 18th century saw the beginning of a major ironworks in the town and the growth of the brewing trade for which Reading was to become famous. The 19th century saw the coming of the Great Western Railway and the development of the town's brewing, baking and seed growing businesses, and the town grew rapidly as a manufacturing centre. Reading is also the county town of Berkshire.

History

Origins

Occupation at the site of Reading may date back to the Roman period, possibly in the form of a trading port for Calleva Atrebatum. However, the first clear evidence for Reading as a settlement dates from the 8th century, when the town came to be known as Readingas. The name probably comes from the Readingas, an Anglo-Saxon tribe whose name means Reada's People in Old English (the Anglo-Saxons often had the same name for a place and its inhabitants). In late 870, an army of Danes invaded the kingdom of Wessex and set up camp at Reading. On 4 January 871, in the first Battle of Reading, King Ethelred and his brother Alfred the Great attempted unsuccessfully to breach the Danes' defences. The battle is described in the Anglo-Saxon Chronicle, and that account provides the earliest known written record of the existence of Reading. The Danes remained in Reading until late in 871, when they retreated to their winter quarters in London.

After the Battle of Hastings and the Norman conquest of England, William the Conqueror gave land in and around Reading to his foundation of Battle Abbey. In its 1086 Domesday Book listing, the town was explicitly described as a borough. The presence of six mills is recorded: four on land belonging to the king and two on the land given to Battle Abbey. Reading Abbey was founded in 1121 by Henry I, who is buried within the Abbey grounds. As part of his endowments, he gave the abbey his lands in Reading, along with land at Cholsey.

Reading was an important river crossing point: in 1312, King Edward II directed that its bridges should be kept in good order. It is not known how badly Reading was affected by the Black Death that swept through England in the 14th century, but it is known that the abbot, Henry of Appleford, was one of its victims in 1361, and that nearby Henley lost 60% of its population. The Abbey was largely destroyed in 1538 during Henry VIII's dissolution of the monasteries. The last abbot, Hugh Faringdon, was subsequently tried and convicted of high treason and hanged, drawn and quartered in front of the Abbey Church.

By 1525, Reading was the largest town in Berkshire, and tax returns show that Reading was the tenth largest town in England when measured by taxable wealth. By 1611, it had a population of over 5000 and had grown rich on its trade in cloth, as instanced by the fortune made by local merchant John Kendrick.  Reading played an important role during the English Civil War. Despite its fortifications, it had a Royalist garrison imposed on it in 1642. The subsequent Siege of Reading by Parliamentary forces succeeded in April 1643. The town's cloth trade was especially badly damaged, and the town's economy did not fully recover until the 20th century. Reading played a significant role during the Glorious Revolution: the second Battle of Reading was the only substantial military action of the campaign.

The 18th century saw the beginning of a major iron works in the town and the growth of the brewing trade for which Reading was to become famous. Reading's trade benefited from better designed turnpike roads which helped it establish its location on the major coaching routes from London to Oxford and the West Country. In 1723, despite considerable local opposition, the Kennet Navigation opened the River Kennet to boats as far as Newbury. Opposition stopped when it became apparent that the new route benefited the town. After the opening of the Kennet and Avon Canal in 1810, one could go by barge from Reading to the Bristol Channel. From 1714, and probably earlier, the role of county town of Berkshire was shared between Reading and Abingdon. In the eighteenth and nineteenth centuries it was one of the southern termini of the Hatfield and Reading Turnpike that allowed travelers from the north to continue their journey to the west without going through the congestion of London.

During the 19th century, the town grew rapidly as a manufacturing centre. The Great Western Railway arrived in 1841, followed by the South Eastern Railway in 1849 and the London and South Western Railway in 1856. The Summer Assizes were moved from Abingdon to Reading in 1867, effectively making Reading the sole county town of Berkshire, a decision that was officially approved by the privy council in 1869. The town became a county borough under the Local Government Act 1888. The town has been famous for the Three Bs of beer (1785–2010, H & G Simonds), bulbs (1837–1974, Suttons Seeds), and biscuits (1822–1976, Huntley and Palmers).

20th century
The town continued to expand in the 20th century, annexing Caversham across the River Thames in Oxfordshire in 1911. Compared to many other English towns and cities, Reading suffered little physical damage during either of the two world wars that afflicted the 20th century, although many citizens were killed or injured in the conflicts. One significant air raid occurred on 10 February 1943, when a single Luftwaffe plane machine-gunned and bombed the town centre, resulting in 41 deaths and over 100 injuries.

The Lower Earley development, built in 1977, was one of the largest private housing developments in Europe. It extended the urban area of Reading as far as the M4 Motorway, which acts as the southern boundary of the town. Further housing developments have increased the number of modern houses and hypermarkets in the outskirts of Reading. A major town-centre shopping centre, The Oracle, opened in 1999, is named after the 17th-century Oracle workhouse, which once occupied a small part of the site. It provides three storeys of shopping space and boosted the local economy by providing 4,000 jobs.

21st century
As one of the largest urban areas in the United Kingdom to be without city status, Reading has unsuccessfully bid for city status on four recent occasions – in 2000 to celebrate the new millennium; in 2002 to celebrate the Golden Jubilee of Queen Elizabeth II; in 2012 for the Diamond Jubilee; and in 2022 to mark the Platinum Jubilee.

On 20 June 2020, three people were killed  and three others seriously injured in a mass stabbing at Reading's Forbury Gardens that is being treated as a terrorist incident.

Government

Local government for the town of Reading is principally provided by Reading Borough Council, a single level unitary authority without civil parishes. However, some of the town's outer suburbs are in West Berkshire and Wokingham unitary authorities. These outer suburbs belong to civil parishes, in some cases with their own town status. Reading has elected at least one Member of Parliament to every Parliament since 1295. Historically, Reading was represented by the members for the Parliamentary Borough of Reading, and the parliamentary constituencies of Reading, Reading North, and Reading South. Since the 2010 general election, Reading has been divided between the parliamentary constituencies of Reading East, Reading West, Wokingham (which covers Shinfield, most of Earley and Lower Earley) and Maidenhead (which partly covers Woodley).

Reading is the site of venues for both the Crown Court, administering criminal justice, and the County Court, responsible for civil cases. Lesser matters are dealt with in a local magistrates' court. Reading has had some degree of local government autonomy since 1253, when the local merchant guild was granted a royal charter. Since then, the town has been run by a Borough corporation as a county borough, and as a district of Berkshire. The Borough of Reading became a unitary authority area in 1998, when Berkshire County Council was abolished under the Banham Review, and is now responsible for all aspects of local government within the borough.

Prior to the 16th century, civic administration for the town of Reading was situated in the Yield Hall, a guild hall situated by the River Kennet near today's Yield Hall Lane. After a brief stay in what later became Greyfriars Church, the town council created a new town hall by inserting an upper floor into the refectory of the Hospitium of St John, the former hospitium of Reading Abbey. For some 400 years up to the 1970s, this was to remain the site of Reading's civic administration through the successive rebuilds that eventually created today's Town Hall. In 1976, Reading Borough Council moved to the new Civic Centre. In 2014, they moved again to civic offices in a refurbished existing office building on Bridge Street, in order to facilitate the demolition and redevelopment of the previous site.

The government of the Borough of Reading follows the leader and cabinet model. Following the 2011 local elections, a Labour minority administration replaced the previous Conservative-Liberal Democrat coalition on the casting vote of the mayor. After the 2018 elections, Labour have 30 councillors, the Conservatives 12, Greens 3 and Liberal Democrats 1. The borough also has a (largely ceremonial) mayor. Cllr Debs Edwards has been the mayor of Reading since May 2018. Since 1887, the borough has included the former villages of Southcote and Whitley and small parts of Earley and Tilehurst. By 1911, it also encompassed the Oxfordshire village of Caversham and still more of Tilehurst. A small area of Mapledurham parish was added in 1977. An attempt to take over a small area of Eye and Dunsden parish in Oxfordshire was rejected because of strong local opposition in 1997. Today the borough itself is unparished, and the wards used to elect the borough councillors generally ignore the old parish boundaries and use invented ward names.

Reading's municipal boundaries do not include all of the surrounding suburbs. Some of these areas (Tilehurst, Calcot, Earley, Winnersh and Woodley) are, at least partly, within West Berkshire or Wokingham Borough. This unusual configuration creates difficulties. The diminishing amount of land available and suitable for development within the borough's boundary can bring the council into conflict with its neighbours' development plans; this is exacerbated by the fact that the wards within the borough boundaries have tended to elect Labour councillors, while the suburban wards outside the borough have tended to vote Conservative. This particularly affects education (many schools have catchment areas that cross administrative boundaries), and transport. A perennial example is whether to construct a third road crossing of the Thames, which South Oxfordshire's politicians and residents oppose. On this subject, Rob Wilson, then Member of Parliament for Reading East, said in a House of Commons debate in January 2006:

Geography

The centre of Reading is on a low ridge between the River Thames and River Kennet, close to their confluence, reflecting the town's history as a river port. Just above the confluence, the Kennet cuts through a narrow steep-sided gap in the hills forming the southern flank of the Thames flood plain. The absence of a flood plain on the Kennet in this defile enabled the development of wharves. The floodplains adjoining Reading's two rivers are subject to occasional flooding.

As Reading has grown, its suburbs have spread: to the west between the two rivers into the foothills of the Berkshire Downs as far as Calcot, Tilehurst and Purley; to the south and south-east on the south side of the River Kennet as far as Whitley Wood and Lower Earley and as far north of the Thames into the Chiltern Hills as far as Caversham Heights, Emmer Green and Caversham Park Village. Outside the central area, the floors of the valleys containing the two rivers remain largely unimproved floodplain. Apart from the M4 curving to the south there is only one road across the Kennet flood plain. All other routes between the three built-up areas are in the central area.

Historically, the town of Reading was smaller than the borough. Definitions include the old ecclesiastical parishes of the churches of St Mary, St Laurence and St Giles, or the even smaller pre-19th century borough. Today, as well as the town centre Reading comprises a number of suburbs and other districts, both within the borough itself and within the surrounding urban area. The names and location of these suburbs are in general usage but, except where some of the outer suburbs correspond to civil parishes, there are no formally defined boundaries. The Reading urban area (officially Reading/Wokingham) additionally includes Winnersh, Wokingham, Crowthorne and the civil parishes of Earley, Woodley, Purley, Tilehurst and Shinfield.

Climate
Like the rest of the United Kingdom, Reading has a maritime climate, with limited seasonal temperature ranges and generally moderate rainfall throughout the year. The nearest official Met Office weather station is located at the Reading University Atmospheric Observatory on the Whiteknights Campus, which has recorded atmospheric measurements and meteorological observations since 1970.

Demography

Meanwhile, the wider urban area had a population of 318,014 in the 2011 census, ranking 23rd in the United Kingdom. This grew to an estimated 337,108 by mid-2018. According to the 2011 census, 74.8% of the borough's population were described as White (65.3% White British), 9.1% as South Asian, 6.7% as Black, 3.9% Mixed, 4.5% as Chinese and 0.9% as other ethnic group. In 2010, it was reported that Reading had 150 different spoken languages within its population. Reading has a large Polish community, which dates back over 30 years, and in October 2006 the Reading Chronicle printed 5,000 copies of a Polish edition called the Kronika Reading.

Ethnicity

Religion

Economy

Reading is an important commercial centre in the Thames Valley and Southern England. The town hosts the headquarters of several British companies and the United Kingdom offices of foreign multinationals, as well as being a major retail centre. Whilst located close enough to London to be sometimes regarded as part of the London commuter belt, Reading is a net inward destination for commuters. During the morning peak period, there are some 30,000 inward arrivals in the town, compared to 24,000 departures. Major companies Microsoft, Oracle and Hibu (formerly Yell Group) have their headquarters in Reading. The insurance company Prudential has an administration centre in the town. PepsiCo and Wrigley have offices.

Global pharmaceutical giant Bayer Life Sciences relocated to Reading's Green Park Business Park in 2016. Reading has a significant historical involvement in the information technology industry, largely as a result of the early presence in the town of sites of International Computers Limited and Digital Equipment Corporation. Other technology companies with a significant presence in the town include Huawei Technologies, Pegasystems, Access IS, CGI Inc., Agilent Technologies, Cisco, Ericsson, Symantec, Verizon Business, and Commvault. These companies are distributed around Reading or just outside the borough boundary, some in business parks including Thames Valley Park in nearby Earley, Green Park Business Park and Arlington Business Park.

Reading town centre is a major shopping centre. In 2007, an independent poll placed Reading 16th in a league table of best performing retail centres in the United Kingdom. The main shopping street is Broad Street, which runs between The Oracle in the east and Broad Street Mall in the west and was pedestrianised in 1995. The smaller Friars Walk in Friar Street is closed and will be demolished if the proposed Station Hill redevelopment project goes ahead. There are three major department stores in Reading: John Lewis & Partners (known as Heelas until 2001), Debenhams (now closed down), and House of Fraser. The Broad Street branch of bookseller Waterstone's is a conversion of a nonconformist chapel dating from 1707. Besides the two major shopping malls, Reading has three smaller shopping arcades, the Bristol and West Arcade, Harris Arcade and The Walk, which contain smaller specialist stores. An older form of retail facility is represented by Union Street, popularly known as Smelly Alley. Reading has no indoor market, but there is a street market in Hosier Street. A farmers' market operates on two Saturdays a month.

Culture

Every year Reading hosts the Reading Festival, which has been running since 1971. The festival takes place on the Friday, Saturday and Sunday of the August bank holiday weekend and is the largest of its kind in the United Kingdom aside from the Glastonbury Festival. Reading Festival takes place at Little Johns Farm in Reading, Richfield Avenue. For some twenty years until 2006, Reading was also known for its WOMAD Festival until it moved to Charlton Park in Malmesbury, Wiltshire. The Reading Beer Festival was first held in 1994 and has now grown to one of the largest beer festivals in the United Kingdom. It is held at King's Meadow for the five days immediately preceding the May Day bank holiday every year. Reading also holds Reading Pride, an annual LGBT festival in Kings Meadow.

The Frank Matcham-designed Royal County Theatre, built in 1895, was located on the south side of Friar Street. It burned down in 1937. Within the town hall is a 700-seat concert hall that houses a Father Willis organ. Reading theatre venues include The Hexagon and South Street Arts Centre. Reading Repetory Theatre is based at Reading College: its Royal Patron is Prince Edward, Duke of Edinburgh.
Amateur theatre venues in Reading include Progress Theatre, a self-governing, self-funding theatre group and registered charity founded in 1947 that operates and maintains its own 97-seat theatre. The demonym for a person from Reading is Redingensian, giving the name of the local rugby team Redingensians, based in Sonning, and of former members of Reading School.

Cultural references
Jane Austen attended Reading Ladies Boarding School, based in the Abbey Gateway, in 1784–1786. Mary Russell Mitford lived in Reading for a number of years and then spent the rest of her life just outside the town at Three Mile Cross and Swallowfield. The fictional Belford Regis of her eponymous novel, first published in 1835, is largely based on Reading. Described with topographical accuracy, it is still possible to follow the steps of the novel's characters in present-day Reading. Reading also appears in the works of Thomas Hardy where it is called 'Aldbrickham'. It features most heavily in his final novel, Jude the Obscure, as the temporary home of Jude Fawley and Sue Bridehead.

Oscar Wilde was imprisoned in Reading Gaol from 1895 to 1897. While there, he wrote his letter De Profundis. After his release, he lived in exile in France and wrote The Ballad of Reading Gaol, based on his experience of the execution of Charles Wooldridge, carried out in Reading Gaol whilst he was imprisoned there. Ricky Gervais, who is from Reading, made the film Cemetery Junction, which, although filmed elsewhere in the United Kingdom, is set in 1970s Reading and is named after a busy junction in East Reading. Jasper Fforde's Nursery Crimes Division novels, The Big Over Easy and The Fourth Bear, are also placed in Reading. The BBC Two sitcom Beautiful People, based on the memoirs of Simon Doonan, is set in Reading in the late 1990s.

Landmarks
The Maiwand Lion in Forbury Gardens, an unofficial symbol of Reading, commemorates the 328 officers of the Royal Berkshire Regiment who died in the Battle of Maiwand in 1880. There are a number of other works of public art in Reading. Jacksons Corner with its prominent sign, former home of Jacksons department store, occupies the corner of Kings Road and High Street, just south of the Market Place. Reading has six Grade I listed buildings, 22 Grade II* and 853 Grade II buildings, in a wide variety of architectural styles that range from the medieval to the 21st century. The Grade I listed buildings are Reading Abbey, the Abbey Gateway, Greyfriars Church, St Laurence's Church, Reading Minster, and the barn at Chazey Farmhouse on the Warren.

Media
Reading has a local newspaper, the Reading Chronicle, published on Thursdays. The town's other local newspaper, the Reading Post, ceased publication on paper in December 2014, in order to transition to an online only format under the title getreading. As of 2018, getreading joined the InYourArea local news network. A local publishing company, the Two Rivers Press, has published over 70 book titles, many on the topic of local history and art. Two local radio stations broadcast from Reading: BBC Radio Berkshire and Heart South. Other local radio stations, such as Capital Mid-Counties and Basingstoke's Greatest Hits Radio Berkshire & North Hampshire, can also be received. Reading has one local television station, That's Thames Valley, which broadcasts local news throughout the Greater Reading area. Local television news programmes are the BBC's South Today and ITV's Meridian Tonight are available on BBC One and ITV.

Public services

Parks and open spaces
Reading has over 100 parks and playgrounds, including  of riverside paths. In the town centre is Forbury Gardens, a public park built on the site of the outer court of Reading Abbey. The largest public park in Reading is Prospect Park, an estate in west Reading previously owned by Frances Kendrick but acquired by Reading Corporation in 1901. This is complemented by Palmer Park, a purpose built public park in east Reading gifted to the town by the proprietors of Huntley & Palmers in 1889.

A string of open spaces stretch along one or other side of the River Thames throughout its passage through Reading. From west to east these are Thameside Promenade, Caversham Court, Christchurch Meadows, Hills Meadow, View Island and King's Meadow. Reading also has five local nature reserves: Clayfield Copse in Caversham, with the other four McIlroy Park, Blundells Copse, Lousehill Copse and Round Copse all in Tilehurst

Healthcare
The principal National Health Service (NHS) hospital in Reading is the Royal Berkshire Hospital, founded in 1839 and much enlarged and rebuilt since. A second major NHS general hospital, the Battle Hospital, closed in 2005. Berkshire Healthcare NHS Foundation Trust runs a NHS hospital, Prospect Park Hospital, which specialises in the provision of care for people with mental health and learning disabilities. Reading has three private hospitals: the Berkshire Independent Hospital in Coley Park, the Dunedin Hospital situated on the main A4 Bath Road, and the Circle Hospital at Kennet Island.

Utilities
Mains water and sewerage services are provided by Thames Water Utilities Limited, a private sector water supply company, whilst water abstraction and disposal is regulated by the Environment Agency. Reading's water supply is largely derived from underground aquifers, and as a consequence the water is hard.

The commercial energy supplier for electricity and gas is at the consumer's choice. Southern Electric runs the local electricity distribution network, while SGN runs the gas distribution network. A notable part of the local energy infrastructure is the presence of a 2 megawatt (peak) Enercon wind turbine at Green Park Business Park, with the potential to produce 2.7 million kWh of electricity a year, enough to power over a thousand homes. Additionally, Reading Hydro runs a micro hydroelectric power station on the Thames. Reading had its own power station in Vastern Road from 1895 to the 1960s. The power station was initially owned and operated by the Reading Electric Supply Company Limited, then from 1933 by the Reading Corporation until the nationalisation of the British electricity supply industry in 1948.

The dialling code for fixed-line telephones in Reading is 0118. BT provides fixed-line telephone coverage throughout the town and ADSL broadband internet connection to most areas. Parts of Reading are cabled by Virgin Media, supplying cable television, telephone and broadband internet connections. Hyperoptic also has a presence in the town, supplying Fibre-to-the-Premises (FTTP) broadband internet connections at speeds of up to 1 Gbit/s.

Education

Reading School, founded in 1125, is the 16th oldest school in England. There are six other state secondary schools and 38 state primary schools within the borough, together with a number of private and independent schools and nurseries. Alfred Sutton Boys' School closed in the mid-1980s. Reading College has provided further education in Reading since 1955, with over 8,500 local learners on over 900 courses. English language schools in Reading include Gateway Languages, the English Language Centre, ELC London Street and Eurospeak Language School.

The University of Reading was established in 1892 as an affiliate of Oxford University. It moved to its London Road Campus in 1904 and to its new Whiteknights Campus in 1947. It took over the Bulmershe College of Higher Education, a teacher training college, in 1989, becoming Bulmershe Court Campus. The University of West London maintains a presence in the town for its higher education students, principally in nursing, but has now divested itself of its previous ownership of Reading College and its further education students.

Libraries and museums
The Reading Borough Libraries service dates back to 1877. Initially housed in Reading Town Hall, the central branch of the library was relocated to a new building on King's Road in 1985.

The Reading Museum opened in 1883 in the town's municipal buildings. It contains galleries relating to the history of Reading and to the excavations of Calleva Atrebatum, together with a full-size replica of the Bayeux Tapestry, an art collection, and galleries relating to Huntley and Palmers. The Museum of English Rural Life, in East Reading, is a museum dedicated to recording the changing face of farming and the countryside in England. It houses designated collections of national importance. It is owned and run by the University of Reading, as are the Ure Museum of Greek Archaeology, the Cole Museum of Zoology and the Harris Botanic Gardens, all of which can be found on the university's Whiteknights Campus. The small Riverside Museum at Blake's Lock tells the story of Reading's two rivers. The Museum of Berkshire Aviation has a collection of aircraft and other artefacts relating to the aircraft industry in the town.

Transport

Reading's location in the Thames Valley to the west of London has made the town a significant element in the nation's transport system.

River
The town grew up as a river port at the confluence of the River Thames and the River Kennet. Both of these rivers are navigable, and Caversham Lock, Blake's Lock, County Lock, Fobney Lock and Southcote Lock are all within the borough. Today, navigation is predominantly for purposes of leisure: private and hire boats dominate traffic, while scheduled boat services operate on the Thames from wharves on the Reading side of the river near Caversham Bridge.

Road
Reading was a major staging point on the old Bath Road (A4) from London to Avonmouth near Bristol. This road still carries local traffic, but has now been replaced for long-distance traffic by the M4 motorway, which closely skirts the borough and serves it with three junctions, J10-J12. Other main roads serving Reading include the A33, A327, A329, A4074 and A4155. Within Reading there is the Inner Distribution Road (IDR), a ring road for local traffic. The IDR is linked with the M4 by the A33 relief road. National Express Coaches run out of Mereoak Park and Ride, at Junction 11 of the M4. The Thames is crossed by both Reading and Caversham road bridges, while several road bridges cross the Kennet, the oldest surviving one of which is High Bridge.

Rail
Reading is a major junction point of the National Rail system, and hence Reading station is an important transfer point and terminus. In a project that finished in 2015, Reading station was redeveloped at a cost of £850m, with grade separation of some conflicting traffic flows, and extra platforms, to relieve severe congestion at this station. Railway lines link Reading to both Paddington and Waterloo stations in London. Other stations in the Reading area are Reading West, Tilehurst and Earley. Reading Green Park railway station is planned on the Reading to Basingstoke Line to serve Green Park Business Park.

Reading is a western terminus of the Elizabeth line, which provides stopping services to London Paddington, and means Reading is featured on the London Tube map. When the Crossrail project is fully delivered in mid-2023, cross-London connections will be possible from Reading to Abbey Wood and Shenfield in the east; passengers desiring through service are currently required to change trains at Paddington.

Air
There have been two airfields in or near Reading, one at Coley Park and one at Woodley, but they have both closed. An express bus service named RailAir links Reading with Heathrow, or the airport can be accessed by rail by taking the Paddington train and changing to the TfL Rail service at Hayes & Harlington. In addition, Birmingham Airport, Gatwick Airport and Southampton Airport can all be accessed via direct trains from Reading station.

Public transport
Today local public transport is largely by road, which is often affected by peak hour congestion in the borough. A frequent local bus network within the borough, and a less frequent network in the surrounding area, are provided by Reading Buses - one of the few remaining municipal bus companies in the country - and its subsidiaries Newbury & District and Thames Valley Buses. Other bus operators serving Reading include Arriva Shires & Essex, Thames Travel and Oxford Bus Company. ReadiBus provides an on-demand transport service for people with restricted mobility in the area.

Bike sharing
In March 2011, Reading Borough Council approved a bike sharing scheme similar to London Cycle Hire Scheme, with 1,000 bicycles available at up to 150 docking stations across Reading. However this scheme came to an end in March 2019, with the operator unable to cover the operational costs or find a sponsor to do so.

Religion

Reading Minster (the Minster Church of St Mary the Virgin) is Reading's oldest ecclesiastical foundation, known to have been founded by the 9th century and possibly earlier. Although eclipsed in importance by the later abbey, Reading Minster has regained its importance since the destruction of the abbey. Reading Abbey was founded by Henry I in 1121. He was buried there, as were parts of his daughter Empress Matilda, William of Poitiers, Constance of York, and Princess Isabella of Cornwall, among others. The abbey was one of the pilgrimage centres of medieval England; it held over 230 relics including the hand of St. James. Today all that remains of the abbey are the inner rubble cores of the walls of many of the major buildings of the abbey, together with a much restored inner gateway and the intact hospitium.

The medieval borough of Reading was served by three parish churches: Reading Minster, St Giles' Church, and St Laurence's Church. All are still in use by the Church of England. The Franciscan friars built a friary in the town in 1311. After the friars were expelled in 1538, the building was used as a hospital, a poorhouse, and a jail, before being restored as the Church of England parish church of Greyfriars Church in 1863. The Bishop of Reading is a suffragan bishop within the Church of England's Diocese of Oxford. The bishop is based in Reading, and is responsible for the archdeaconry of Berkshire. There are a total of 18 Church of England parish churches in Reading.

St James's Church was built on a portion of the site of the abbey between 1837 and 1840, and marked the return of the Roman Catholic faith to Reading. Reading was also the site of the death of Blessed Dominic Barberi, the Catholic missionary to England in the 19th century who received John Henry Newman into the Catholic faith. There are now eight Roman Catholic parish churches in Reading. Kings Road Baptist Church was founded in Reading in 1640 or 1641. In addition to Catholicism and the Church of England, the Seventh-Day Adventist denomination is also represented in the town, particularly by Reading West SDA Church on Loverock Road, Reading Central SDA Church on Tilehurst Road, and various other churches around Reading.

Reading has had an organised Jewish community since 1886. At least one Jewish family living in the area has been traced back as far as 1842. The group grew to 13 families, who in 1886 declared themselves a community and commenced building a synagogue. On 31 October 1900, Reading Hebrew Congregation officially opened in a solemn public ceremony, packed to capacity with dignitaries, led by the Chief Rabbi Hermann Adler. Reading Hebrew Congregation, which still stands on its original site at the junction of Goldsmid Road and Clifton Street near the town centre, is a Grade II-listed building, built to a traditional design in the Moorish style. The community is affiliated with the Orthodox United Hebrew Congregations of the Commonwealth. Reading also has a Liberal Jewish community which convenes in the Reading Quaker Meeting House, a Modern Orthodox Judaism community, an active Jewish Society for students at the university, as well as being served by a Reform Jewish community which convenes in nearby Maidenhead Synagogue.

There are presently three mosques in Reading, initially just having the Central Reading Mosque on Waylen Street. The £3–4m Abu Bakr Islamic Centre, on Oxford Road in West Reading, was granted planning permission in 2002. The community-funded project began construction in 2007, and opened its doors in July 2013 - the holy month of Ramadan for this year. A second Islamic centre in eastern Reading has also been granted planning permission. This £4m project has garnered some controversy. Reading also has places of worship of other religions: the Shantideva Mahayana Buddhist centre, a Hindu temple, a Sikh gurdwara, a Salvation Army citadel, a Quaker meeting house, and a Christadelphian Hall.

Sport

 

Reading is the home of Reading Football Club, an association football club nicknamed The Royals, formed in 1871. Formerly nicknamed 'The Biscuitmen'  and based at Elm Park, the club plays at the 24,161 capacity Madejski Stadium, named after chairman Sir John Madejski, and which opened in 1998. After winning the 2005–06 Football League Championship with a record of 106 points, Reading spent two seasons in the Premier League before being relegated to The Championship. For the 2012–2013 season, the club again competed in the Premier League, after securing first place in the Championship in the 2011–2012 season, but were relegated back down to the Championship at season's end. Reading Town Football Club, formed in 1966, played at Scours Lane and were playing in the Hellenic League Premier Division but were dissolved in 2016, while fellow non-league football club Reading City Football Club now play at Scours Lane after moving from Palmer Park Stadium at the end of the 2015–16 season. Scours Lane was also renamed to Rivermoor Stadium in 2016.

Reading is home to three senior semi-professional rugby clubs: Reading Abbey RFC, Rams RFC and Reading RFC. The Reading Rockets are the town's semi-professional basketball team. They compete in the second tier English Basketball League Division 1, though they have tried several times in recent years to move up to the top tier British Basketball League. They play home games at the Rivermead Leisure Complex, and are coached by Manuel Peña Garces. In 2016–17 the club embarked on an 18-game winning streak. The town hosts Australian Rules football team Reading Kangaroos and American football team Berkshire Renegades. Palmer Park Stadium has a velodrome and athletics track. It is used by Reading Athletic Club and the Berkshire Renegades for training. Reading Hockey Club enter teams in both the Men's and Women's England Hockey Leagues.

Rowing is pursued by the Reading Rowing Club and the Reading University Boat Club, both next to Caversham Bridge, whilst Reading Blue Coat School trains at Sonning adjacent to the Redgrave Pinsent Rowing Lake in Caversham, which provides training facilities for the Great Britain National Squad. However, almost all club rowing is done on the River Thames. The annual Reading Town Regatta takes place near Thames Valley Park, with the Reading Amateur Regatta taking place in June, usually two weeks before the Henley Royal Regatta. The town was home to a motorcycle speedway team, Reading Racers. Speedway came to Reading in 1968 at Tilehurst Stadium, until the team moved to Smallmead Stadium in Whitley, which was demolished at the end of 2008. The team is inactive pending the building of a new stadium, which was once hoped to be completed in 2012. The Reading Racers reformed in 2016 and joined the new Southern Developmental League upon its formation in 2017 winning its inaugural season undefeated. The team started back up in Eastbourne and currently races in Swindon awaiting return to a track in Reading.

The Reading Half Marathon is held on the streets of Reading in March of each year, with 16,000 competitors from elite to fun runners. It was first run in 1983 and has taken place in every subsequent year except 2001, when it was cancelled because of concerns over that year's outbreak of foot-and-mouth disease, 2018, when it was cancelled on the morning of the race due to heavy overnight snowfall, and 2020, when it was cancelled due to the COVID-19 pandemic. The British Triathlon Association was formed at the town's former Mall health club on 11 December 1982. Britain's first ever triathlon took place just outside Reading at Kirtons's Farm in Pingewood in 1983 and was revived 10 years' later by Banana Leisure with one of the original organisers as Event Director. Thames Valley Triathletes, based in the town, is Britain's oldest triathlon club, having its origins in the 1984 event at nearby Heckfield, when a relay team raced under the name Reading Triathlon Club. The Hexagon was home to snooker's Grand Prix tournament, one of the sport's "Big Four", from 1984 to 1994.

Notable people

Twin towns

Reading is twinned with:
 Düsseldorf, Germany (since 1947, officially since 1988)
 Clonmel, Ireland (since 1994)
 San Francisco Libre, Nicaragua (since 1994)
 Speightstown, Barbados (since 2003)

Though not twinned with Reading, two suburbs of the New Zealand city of Dunedin — Caversham and Forbury — were named after places in and around Reading by early New Zealand settler and Reading native William Henry Valpy.

See also 

List of administrative counties and county boroughs of England by population in 1971
List of college towns
List of conservation areas in England
List of English districts
List of non-US places that have a US place named after them
List of towns in England
List of unitary authorities of England
2020 Reading stabbings
Murder of Emily Salvini
Reading power station

References

Bibliography

External links

 Reading Borough Council

 
Towns in Berkshire
Kennet and Avon Canal
Local authorities adjoining the River Thames
Districts of Berkshire
Populated places established in the 8th century
Populated places on the River Thames
Unitary authority districts of England
Unparished areas in Berkshire
Boroughs in England